Urban Search and Rescue Nebraska Task Force 1 or NE-TF1 is a FEMA Urban Search and Rescue Task Force based in Lincoln, Nebraska, United States. NE-TF1 is sponsored by the Lincoln Fire & Rescue Department.

References

Nebraska 1
Organizations based in Lincoln, Nebraska